In category theory, a branch of mathematics, the categorical trace is a generalization of the trace of a matrix.

Definition
The trace is defined in the context of a symmetric monoidal category C, i.e., a category equipped with a suitable notion of a product . (The notation reflects that the product is, in many cases, a kind of a tensor product.) An object X in such a category C is called dualizable if there is another object  playing the role of a dual object of X. In this situation, the trace of a morphism  is defined as the composition of the following morphisms:

where 1 is the monoidal unit and the extremal morphisms are the coevaluation and evaluation, which are part of the definition of dualizable objects.

The same definition applies, to great effect, also when C is a symmetric monoidal ∞-category.

Examples
 If C is the category of vector spaces over a fixed field k, the dualizable objects are precisely the finite-dimensional vector spaces, and the trace in the sense above is the morphism

which is the multiplication by the trace of the endomorphism f in the usual sense of linear algebra.

 If C is the ∞-category of chain complexes of modules (over a fixed commutative ring R), dualizable objects V in C are precisely the perfect complexes. The trace in this setting captures, for example, the Euler characteristic, which is the alternating sum of the ranks of its terms:

Further applications

 have used categorical trace methods to prove an algebro-geometric version of the Atiyah–Bott fixed point formula, an extension of the Lefschetz fixed point formula.

References

 

Category theory
Fixed-point theorems
Geometry